Eternity: A Chinese Ghost Story (倩女幽魂) is a Chinese period drama series produced by Taiwanese station CTS in collaboration with several other countries. It is loosely based several famous folktales such as the love story of Nie Xiaoqian and Ning Caicheng from Pu Songling's novel Strange Stories from a Chinese Studio (聊斋志异), the legend of Gan Jiang and Mo Ye and others. The cast consists of actors from China, Hong Kong, Taiwan, Malaysia and Singapore.

Plot synopsis
Since the Year of Yuan, the empire of Tang has enjoyed one hundred years of prosperity. However, calamities and dangers nearly always lurk around affluent times.

The famous Taoist sect, Xuan-Xin Zhen-Zong's forefather once discovered a huge stone cave in a deep mountain range. In the cave was a stone tablet carved with ancient writings. The ancient inscriptions recorded all events since Tang Dynasty's foundation, such as who would be the emperors, when would disasters occur, all of which were all accurate. What struck terror into the hearts of people was the last verse on the tablet, prophesying a grim future: when the constellation of Celestial Demon Clashing with Seven Malignant Stars appears, the Estranged Couple of Seven Lifetimes will be reborn. The demon sect will make use of the power of the Estranged Couple to dominate the world, and the world will be turned into a living hell. The tablet also clearly stated the time and place where the Estranged Couple will be born, seemingly hoping that some destined person would stumble across the tablet, and come up with a plan to save the masses.

The young and capable Jin Guang (Shen Xiao Hai) is the Grand Priest of Tang kingdom, and also the present leader of Xuan-Xin Zhen-Zong Sect. At the designated time, Jin Guang calls forth his elders Yan Chi Xia (Yuen Wah) and Sima San-Niang (Tien Niu) to forestall the demons. Together, they manage to locate the newborn babies of Estranged Couple of Seven Lifetimes. Demon clan Moon Kingdom, under the leadership of Mo-Jun Liu-Dao (Gallen Lo), comes to get hold of the Estranged Couple of Seven Lifetimes, as was predicted. Yan Chi Xia and his wife Sima San-Niang, using all their might, fight against Moon Kingdom. Both sides suffer severe casualties. While Mo-Jun Liu-Dao is badly wounded, he succeeds in taking away the baby girl.

To prevent further complications, Jin-Guang wants to terminate the life of the baby boy, but Yan Chi-Xia and Sima San-Niang cannot simply stand by idly doing nothing while an innocent baby is killed. While already injured, they turn the table against Jin-Guang and battle against Xuan-Xin Zhen-Zong's disciples, affording time for the mother to bring the baby boy away.

After this major battle of good versus evil, Yan Chi Xia and Sima San-Niang disappear from the pugilistic circle. Mo-Jun Liu-Dao is rumoured to have died after being critically hurt by Yan Chi-Xia, and the world enjoys a longer period of peace, for the time being...

Eighteen years later, there lives an impoverished, honest scholar in the bustling city, who makes a living by selling paintings. However, all that he sells are imitations. This scholar is none other than Ning Cai Cheng. Though kind at heart, he puts aside his conscience, replicates the paintings of famous painters flawlessly, and puts them up for sale as the genuine ones, in order to pay for his mother's the medical treatment.

One night, Ning Cai Cheng passes by Ruolan Temple and decides to spend the night there. Unexpectedly, he meets the baby girl who was snatched away by Mo-Jun Liu-Dao. Liu-Dao died eighteen years ago after being gravely injured by Yan Chi Xia, leaving behind his wife Empress Yin-Yue (Zhu Yan) and son Mo Jun Qi-Ye (Nie Yuan). Fearing that the orthodox sects may locate Nie Xiao-Qian, Empress Yin-Yue extracted Nie Xiao-Qian's soul and seal it within the body of a fox spirit with her witchcraft. And now, Nie Xiao Qian (Xu Xi Yuan) has grown into a lovely little fox spirit and finally sees the most important man of her life, Ning Cai Cheng - the baby boy who escaped death.

Nie Xiao-Qian has been living in the remote Moon Kingdom, however, existed within her heart is a longing to find true love of the mortals. Once, she attempted to sneak away but was discovered by Mo-Jun Qi-Ye. The young Qi-Ye is actually carrying a torch for Xiao-Qian, and commiserating with her, he agrees to let Xiao-Qian enter the mortal world, but only when she agrees to a pact. She only has one month's limit to find her true love, and should he still love her even when she reveals her true form as a fox, she is granted freedom to enter or leave the demon realm. Mo-Jun Qi-Ye also gives her Teardrop of Blue Demon, which would glow when someone with genuine feelings for loves her expresses his love for her. Otherwise, she would have to remain forever in Moon Kingdom. If she breaks her vow, she would be vaporised into thin air.

Being ignorant and inexperienced, Xiao Qian fell into the hands of spider demon Mei Ji (Mai Jia Qi). As Nie Xiao Qian hides her identity, Mei Ji does not know her relation with Mo-Jun Qi-Ye. Under the pretext of helping Nie Xiao-Qian finds true love, she uses her to lure men into her lair to help practice her demonic skills. Nie Xiao-Qian is unaware of Mei Ji's nefarious plan and as the time limit approaches, Nie Xiao Qian, seeing that Ning Cai-Cheng is the only guy in front of her, intends to use all means to make him fall for her. However, Ning Cai-Cheng remains unmoved, and even discovers that she is a demon and scampers madly away. Nie Xiao Qian is agitated and anxious, vowing that she would kill him. Zhuge Liu-Yun (Wu Jing), Yan Chi-Xia's disciple comes to his rescue. Yet, when Zhuge Liu-Yun and Ning Cai-Cheng come to know that Nie Xiao-Qian is but a fox spirit looking for genuine love, they decide to help her fulfill her wish. Nie Xiao Qian jumps over the moon, and starts to have better impressions of Ning Cai Cheng.

Sima Hong-Ye (Jessica Hsuan), daughter of Yan Chi-Xia and Sima San-Niang, unhappy over her parents' separation, runs away from home and goes about subduing demons. At that time, on learning of Ruolan Temple being taken over by a tree demon and fox spirit, she travels there and runs into Nie Xiao-Qian. Thinking that she has been harming the people, she wants to destroy her. Zhuge Liu-Yun intervenes, and after coming to blows, the two realize they are from the same sect. Zhuge Liu-Yun is Sima Hong-Ye's senior, however, they have never met. Zhuge Liu-Yun is an orphan whom Yan Chi Xia adopted as a disciple when he was five years old and sent to study with the sect's Elder.

While Zhuge Liuyun is incompetent in occult skills, he insists on labeling himself as Sima Hongye's senior. Sima Hong-Ye, having witnessed his mediocre skills, refuses to acknowledge him as her senior, and seeking freedom of love, she spurns his love and turns down the arranged marriage, which hurts Zhuge Liu-Yun. Both are not willing to budge an inch, thus setting the fur flying whenever they meet. However, little did Hong Ye know that the silly lad is actually the man of her destiny. As it turns out, Xuan-Xin Zhen-Zong's forefather, as a counter measure to the demon realm gaining Estranged Couple of Seven Lifetimes, decided to look for Lovers of Seven Lifetimes to resist against them. As long as Zhuge Liu Yun and Sima Hong-Ye are devoted to each other, their undying love, coupled with priceless swords Gan Jiang and Mo Xie, would be puissant enough to eliminate the demon realm. However, they have become an odd couple instead.

A battle between Yan, Lui Yun and Qu Ye and the forces of Yan Chi-Xia have win but Yan was badly hurt by Qi Ye. But Xiao Qian wants to see Qu Ye and when Cai Cheng uses the arrow he closed his eyes and it shot at Xiao Qian and Qi Ye and there Qi Ye died, Master Yan was badly hurt when he see Liu Yun, Cai Cheng together with Xiao Qian and Xiao Qian died in Cai Cheng's arms. Until 20 years have passed, Liu Yun have walk to go to visit his master Yan, and there he sees Ning Cai Cheng. There they go to the market to see Xiao Qian and Hong Ye after 20 years they use amulets to freeze all the people in the market for the first time they see two girls but it is not them they find they lose hope but when they see the painting of Xiao Qian and Hong Ye and the two girls walk and they see Ning Cai Cheng and Liu Yun and the smile at them.

Cast
 Barbie Shu as Nie Xiao Qian
 Daniel Chan as Ning Cai Cheng
 Nie Yuan as Mo Jun Qi Ye
 Jessica Hsuan as Si Ma Hong Ye/ Hung Yip
 Kimi Hsia as Xia Xiao Xue
 Jacky Wu as Zhuge Liu Yun
 Bernard Tan as Jing Wu Yuan
 Shen Xiao Hai as Jin Guang
 Tien Niu as Sim San Niang
 Yuhaojie Zheng as Xiao Wu Wei
 Yuen Wah as Yan Chi Xia
 Hao Zheng as Childhood Zhuge Liu Yun
 Zhu Yan as Empress Yin Yue / Tree Demon
 Teresa Mak as Mei Ji / Spider Demon
 Bryan Wong as Zhuge Wu Wei
 Sheren Tang as Su Tian Xin
 Pan Jie as Mrs. Ning
 Yuhaojie Zheng as Xiao Wu Wei
 Hang Cheuk Fan as Shangguan Yuan Hang
 Chen Zi Han as Shangguan Yu Er
 Yuen King-dan as Madam Ping
 Apple Hong as Ping An
 Jackie Lui as Zhu Ge Qing Tian
 Amy Chan as Lanmo/ Blue Demon
 Gabriel Harrison as Yi Xi
 Sang Ni as Mo Xie
 Victor Huang as Qian Jiang
 Gallen Lo as Mo Jun Liu Dao/ Six Demon

Introduction on characters 

 Nie Xiao Qian (Barbie Shu)
 
She is one of the star crossed lovers. She is a talkative and kind fox spirit but she can also be very willful to take things for granted. When she does not get her way, she throws tantrums. See how ungrateful and selfish she can be to say words that hurt Hong Ye and Qi Ye despite of how both have helped her!

She is helpful to try to make Yan reconcile with his wife. Xiao Qian can be so unwilling to believe that Qi Ye is the star crossed lover. She still insists that Cai Chen is the one although the evidence is shown. Poor Qi Ye is at his wits ends to try to explain his intention to find out whether they are the star crossed lovers. Yan does the talking for him and she realizes her mistake.

 Ning Cai Chen (Daniel Chan)

He is one of the suspected star crossed lovers. He falls for Xiao Qian and tries to rescue her from marrying the Black demon. He gets poisoned and dies before they are married. He is completely cured by Yan and he shot an arrow at Qi Ye.

 Qi Ye (Nie Yuan)

He is Yin Yue empires young lord. His surprising real identity - he is Cai Chens twin brother! Even before he knows his identity, he wants no suffering to mankind and tries to build up a humane demon world.

He looks very distant and cold but he has a warm heart. He loves Xiao Qian and gives in to her all the time. Knowing that she is in trouble, he comes personally to rescue her from the black demon. He keeps his promise to her in taking care of Xiao Xue by bringing her to the Dark Palace. Qi Ye is upset to know that Gan Jiang is his previous lifetime. He is the star crossed lover and not Cai Chen. His attitude to Empress Yin Yue never changes  still treating her like his mother. He moved to the mortal world and becomes a fortune teller to have a simple life with Empress Yin Yue. However, he still wishes to confirm whether he is the star-crossed lover. When he really is, he decides not to see Xiao Qian again to avoid tragedies.

Mrs Ning dies in an attack on their wedding day. He gets so upset that he becomes a demon again and has a sad ending to die in Cai Chens hands.

 Zhu Ge Liu Yun (Wu Jing)

He is Yans disciple who loves Hong Ye. He is talkative, playful and boastful. In an attempt to save Cai Chen, he says that he can do it but fails miserably  the talisman falls in front of him despite his repeated attempts to raise it!

Many will shake their heads on the way he reveals Cai Chen's 'star crossed lover' identity out of rage. It puts his life into danger and Hong Ye has to protect him. Yan tells him to look for Wu Wei. Wu Wei tells him that he is the son of Qing Tian and Lanmo. He protects Lanmo and dies when the moon demon tries to kill her. The two brothers are on good terms after the ordeal. He becomes sensible and mature. He is no longer reckless and can help San Niang analyze problems when she discusses with Yan over the important issues. The couple is baffled but glad that he changes so much. Liu Yun is upset to know that Wu Wei died to protect Hong Ye but does not hesitate to admit that he will do the same too if she is in danger. The white-haired Hong Ye wishes to kill him because he is a half-demon. He finds it ridiculous to fall for her and is so upset when she dies to make the normal Hong Ye return. He has loved her after kissing her and both write tablets with each other's names at the lovers temple. He takes a long time to accept the real Hong Ye again.

 Zhu Ge Wu Wei (Bryan Wong)

He is Liu Yuns wise elder half-brother. He refuses to be one of the perfect lovers to have a quiet life with Lanmo. He knows no martial arts but learns the shield from Tian Xin to protect Lanmo. He regrets his choice of rejecting Yan upon seeing how pretty Hong Ye is. He has thought that his daughter will be as ugly as him! In order to rescue Hong Ye from Tearless city, he locks himself with Gan Jiang in a cell and is killed. Even before his death, he still tells Hong Ye to try to love his younger brother.

 Si Ma Hong Ye / Hung Yip (Jessica Hsuan)

She is Yans daughter and inherits San Niangs fiery temper. She loves Cai Chen but is irritated by Liu Yuns presence. She presses Xiao Qian and Cai Chen to marry so that she will end her own wishful thoughts. It is funny that all can see through it except the blur Cai Chen! It is also strange that Cai Chen does not recognize her when she suffers one attack and tries to kill him before the wedding. How can he not know her because her face does not change and only her hair turns completely white?

The vital energy makes her lose control finally and becomes unfeeling. She can't even cry when Wu Wei dies for her. So she asked a favour to Xiao Qian to shed tears for him. How does she become the white haired Hong Ye? She prefers to deceive herself and remain in her dream. Liu Yun enters her dreams in order to get her out. However, Liu Yun manages to make the white-haired Hong Ye understand mortal feelings and love. Both fall in love and he finds himself not liking the normal Hong Ye that much although she recovers. Both manage to iron out their differences to fall for each other again. But their romance is short lived when she dies after injuring Qi Ye seriously.

 Si Ma San Niang (Tien Niu)

Chi Xia's hot tempered wife who does not like him to think only of others before himself. She is a skilled physician. She is displeased when Yan teaches Hong Ye Xuan Xin mystic because she is the perfect lover. Once she starts practicing, she can't stop and will die after killing the demons at highest level. The couple quarrel and separate for 10 over years. She thinks that he stays near the spring to get Mo Xie sword to atone for his sins  so that Hong Ye will not die when using the sword. After knowing that Yan decides to kill himself to subdue the sword in the Dark Spring to prevent the evil forces from coming out, they finally reconcile. Strange but she finds more affinity with Qi Ye than the others so she unofficially acknowledges him as her godson. A pity that she dies in his hands but she disallows Yan to seek revenge.

 Yan Chi Xia (Yuen Wah)

San Niang's husband; Hong Ye's father. He is the demon catcher who sacrifices himself in helping others. He risks Hong Ye's life to master Xuan Xin mystic to save mankind. He nearly loses his senses when he tries to stop the Mo Xie sword coming out from the Dark Spring in Wan Qing forest. His family forgives him for his mistakes and they are reconciled.

 Xia Xiao Xue (Kimi Hsia)

She is Xiao Qians close friend, a snow spirit also captured by Mei Ji. She is gentle and quiet. She is alert to detect the Empress Yin Yue has changed and Qi Ye's affections for Xiao Qian. She falls for Qi Ye and understands him well. She happily prepares for Xiao Qian's wedding, only to be there to help to save Mrs Ning unexpectedly she stands beside Qi Ye to treat Mrs Ning while Yan and San Niang sit on the bed to treat Mrs Ning. They look so compatible when he places needles on Mrs Ning while she checks her pulse - Qi Ye can be so blind only to fall for the unreasonable and unappreciative Xiao Qian!

To protect Qi Ye, she does not wish him to know his actual identity. She even shields him in Tearless City and is killed. It is so sad when she fulfills her promise to give him her life when trying to uncover his secret at the illusion pool earlier. She is contented that Qi Ye hugs her before her death

 Jing Wu Yuan (Bernard Tan)

He is Lanmo's elder brother. He looks evil but he isn't. He is also Qi Ye's martial arts teacher and advisor. He killed the moon demon many years ago and has high status in the Yin Yue empire. He does not know that Qing Tian is from Xuan Xin sect and even introduces him into the Yin Yue empire. He later lets him elope with Lanmo. When Yin Yue empire is in trouble because of Qi Yes identity, he still stays and many even choose him to be he next lord.

 Jin Guang (Shen Xiao Hai)

He is the ruler of Xuan Xin sect. He wanted to kill the infant star crossed lovers but was stopped by Yan and San Niang. Both can't bring their hearts to kill the infants. He is ruthless to kill their parents instead. Also jealous of Hong Ye to be the master of Xuan Xin mystic so he also masters it immediately after discovering the scroll. This is against the rule. He masters it so soon and is more powerful than Hong Ye. But the founder deliberately writes it the wrong way so he has a worse fate than her. She turns unfeeling but he loses all his skills! Before he is cured, he is the underdog and even kneels in front of Hong Ye to beg her. But after he recovers, he becomes arrogant again.

He is despicable to feign to agree to Qi Ye and Xiao Qians marriage to end the dispute between morals and demons. But he breaks the promise and kills all demons, including Mrs Ning. This causes the kind and filial Qi Ye to be badly affected and become evil.

 Empress Yin Yue / Tree Demon (Zhu Yan)

She is Six demon's wife and is a tree demon. She is seriously injured after San Niang hits her from the back when she flees. She has a miscarriage so that is why she hates Yan and Lanmo so much. She prays to the moon god but the moon demon comes instead. She lets the moon demon possess her (she enters others thoughts and is a big danger to Yin Yue sect) to make Lanmo suffer. She sets a curse on Lanmo and Lanmo sets a curse on her in return. I really laugh when Lanmo says the curse is actually a form of gift! Lanmo declares that she will never recover unless she finds true love again. Lanmo finds Qi Ye a better son who can make up for the son which she has lost. Actually, she sheds a tear when reading her story but the moon demon reminds her so hatred is built in her heart again.

She really dotes on Qi Ye. However, her greed for power overcomes her. She pretends to give Qi Ye and Xiao Qian their mortal bodies back but she is still interested in making all mortals to become demons. Qi Ye kills her and Liu Yun is saddened that she has tried hard to help when she regains her senses but things still turn out this way.

 Mei Ji / Spider Demon (Teresa Mak)

An evil spider spirit which controls Xiao Qian in the beginning. She tricks Xiao Qian to find men to increase her powers. She is Empress Yin Yues close friend and comes to stay in the Dark Palace. She sheds tears after reading Lanmos story. The 4 guardians are after her when they think that she is responsible for Empress Yin Yues ordeal. She brings Lanmos book with her and is curious about love. Can you believe that she lets men off now even though she feels hungry? Upon seeing that she has changed, Yan allows her to take care of Yuan Hang. She is genuinely in love with him but she gets poisoned. Yu Er does this to her when Mei Ji can't bear to kill her. The poison makes her reveal her real form and Yu Er lies that this spider demon has killed Mei Ji. She requests Yu Er to keep the truth from Yuan Hang before she dies. Despite this, she is contented to find true love in the mortal world like Lanmo.

 Su Tian Xin (Sheren Tang)

She is Mo Xie's cousin and Gan Jiang's ex-love interest. She has magical powers and witnesses her 3 friendsdeaths on the same day. Mo Xie tells her to use Mo Xie sword to kill Gan Jiang to make him vanish forever. Tian Xin can't bear to do it. She is still in love with him. She kills him with her powers but he always reappears. She can only reduce his grief through the writing of love stories and trying to find more to write on. Since then, she hasn't grown old all the 7 lifetimes!

She is curious to know about Qing Tian and Lanmos love. She cooks up the story about the 100 candles as she knows that there is no cure for Liu Yun. Liu Yun is destined to die even as an adult. However, she is touched when Lanmo manages to create miracles repeatedly. She brings Wu Wei to the Tearless city to make him and also others to know about the past. She has hoped that Xuan Xin mystic can help to reduce the demonic power. But Hong Ye disappoints her because she is untrue to her feelings. The surprising part is she writes the skill but she does not master it! Qi Ye, Wu Wei, Hong Ye and Xiao Qian are lured into the city. Upon seeing Gan Jiang suffering for long, she jumps into the furnace to be the heart of Mo Xie sword. It finally kills him and leads the rest out of the city.

 Mrs. Ning (Pan Jie)

She has all along wanted a peaceful life after the ordeal and suffers from amnesia. She is very forgetful but sometimes can remember important details. She remembers Xiao Qian well - maybe because of too many repeated scenes that make her reveal her true fox demon form? She is overjoyed that Qi Ye is her son. But their reunion is short-lived when they meet again for the second time on his wedding day.

 Shangguan Yuan Hang (Hang Cheuk Fan)

He is Jin Guang's nephew and is a kind general who is dying of sickness. After Yu Er saves Mei Ji, he falls for her and she looks after him. They fall in love and he proposes to her. He is tricked by Yu Er that Mei Ji is killed when she reveals her real form. He runs after her but is so grieved over her death that he faints. He survives when Yu Er feeds him the pills that moon devil gives her. He has forgotten his love for all. But he manages to maintain a clear mind before he dies.

 Shangguan Yu Er (Chen Zihan)

She is Jin Guangs niece and Yuan Hangs wicked sister who kills her fiancé as she looks down on him. She is trapped in Tearless city for this evil deed. She turns into a better person when trapped but when she is out, she becomes selfish again. She is willing to do anything to make her dying brother happy.

She keeps the demons from Dark Palace. She wants them to kill the Emperor when Yuan Hang loses his power in court. She calls herself the new lord. but Qi Ye, the previous lord, has more talking power to persuade the demons to change their minds. She is made use by moon demon and poisons Mei Ji, thinking that this will prolong Yuan Fans life. Still, she is depressed when Mei Ji chooses to die by her sword. She later regrets her decision when Yuan Hang becomes unfeeling so she kills herself.

 Madam Ping (Yuen King-dan)

Ping An's mother, very exaggerated in the way she is in A kindred spirit.

 Ping An (Apple Hong)

She is a village girl who is not afraid to tell her feelings to Liu Yun. But, she is too desperate to offer herself to him when she thinks that he has killed the fire dragon. I detest her to frame Lanmo for the forest fires that she herself causes. Poor Lanmo takes the blame for so many times! This selfish woman wants Liu Yun to stay with her forever! But her efforts come to naught when he still wants to leave.

 Zhu Ge Qing Tian (Jackie Lui)

He is Yans junior who falls for Lanmo when he goes undercover in Yin Yue sect. Both sects can't condone his act when Lanmo is pregnant with his child. He still returns for her with an injured arm. Lanmo is so moved that she drops a tear. It combines with Qing Tian's blood and becomes a blue gem. He entrusts Liu Yun to Tian Xin to give to Yan to bring him up. He later jumps off the cliff in front of Jin Guang and his wife follows suit.

 Lanmo / Blue Demon (Amy Chan)

She is Liu Yun's mother with blue eyes. She questions Qing Tians initial intention but falls for him after he tells her love stories between mortals. She compiles them into a book and they even spend a night together. All realize that he is a spy when Six demon dies in the attack against Xuan Xin sect.

Lanmo gives birth to Liu Yun and he does not cry at all. She gets 100 candles from 100 households and cures him. But under Empress Yin Yues curse, she is turned into a fire dragon immediately and can't revert to the human form again. Both are forced to part for 20 years. She helps him to be a hero by pretending to be killed by him. She also helps him to burn a route for the villagers too. When Liu Yun dies a second time, she does the same begging but it does not work this time. So she gives up her life for him but is reassured that her son has grown up.

 Yi Xi (Gabriel Harrison)

He is a despicable man who poisons his senior, Gan Jiang in order to get his junior, Mo Xie. Gan Jiang burns himself to death after he turns mad. Yi Xi knows that they are in love. He has four unsuccessful tries to break his masters sword into two. Seeing how Mo Xie is so determined to die instead of being with him, he becomes revengeful and curses them for 7 lifetimes before becoming Yi Xi sword. His next lifetime is the Yin Yue empires first demon lord  that is why Yi Xi sword symbolizes the imperial authority like an emperor of the empire too. Another surprise at the end  he is Cai Chen's pastlife!

 Mo Xie (Sang Ni)

Xiao Qian's previous lifetime. She is deeply in love with Gan Jiang and upon knowing his sad fate, she is willing to suffer for 7 lifetimes and tells Tian Xin to end it for them. She jumps into the furnace without hesitation to become Mo Xie sword.

 Gan Jiang (Victor Huang)

Qi Ye's previous lifetime. He hides his love for Mo Xie. Her father allows the person to damage his sword to marry his daughter. He gives all his chances to Yi Xi. Still, Yi Xi adds demon aroma to the sword that he is making and he turns evil. Tian Xin locks him in Tearless city for 7 lifetimes but he still kills people with one slash. He dies in Tian Xin's hands  with Mo Xie sword vanishing too.

 Jun Liu Dao/ Six Demon (Gallen Lo)

Empress Yin Yue's husband and was killed by Yan Chi Xia in first episode. He is gay.

Trivia
This is Barbie Shu's first appearance after the prequel Meteor Garden and the sequel Meteor Garden II as a solo actress.

References

2003 Chinese television series debuts
2003 Chinese television series endings
Television shows based on Strange Stories from a Chinese Studio
Television series set in the Tang dynasty
Mandarin-language television shows